The Pakistan Council of Architects and Town Planners (abbreviated as PCATP), established in 1983, is a federal regulatory authority for architects and town planners based in Pakistan. Its headquarters is located in Islamabad.

The Pakistan Council of Architects and Town Planners Ordinance 1983 has been promulgated with a view to give recognition and protection to the profession of architecture and town planning in Pakistan. The council has wide-ranging powers and is authorized to perform all functions and to take steps connected with or ancillary to all aspects of the two professions including laying down standards of conduct, safeguarding interests of its members, assisting the government and national institutions in solving national problems relating to the professions, promotion of reforms in the professions, promotion of education of these professions, reviewing and advising the government in the matter of architecture and town planning education, etc.

In March 2021, Arif Changezi was elected as new chairman of this organization.

Pakistan Council for Architects and Town Planners (PCATP) is a regulatory authority and acts as an accreditation council of Higher Education Commission of Pakistan.

References

External links
 PCATP official website

Professional certification in architecture
Pakistan federal departments and agencies
Professional associations based in Pakistan
1983 establishments in Pakistan
Architectural education
Architecture in Pakistan
Government agencies established in 1983
Science and technology in Pakistan